Hugh Sadler Balkam (February 15, 1918 – January 21, 1978) was a Canadian politician. He served in the Legislative Assembly of New Brunswick as member of the Liberal party from 1944 to 1952.

References

1918 births
1978 deaths
New Brunswick Liberal Association MLAs